Michael K. Hanna Sr. (born August 25, 1953) is an American politician from Pennsylvania who served as a Democratic member of the Pennsylvania House of Representatives for the 76th district from January 1, 1991 to January 1, 2019. On February 12, 2018 he announced his retirement from public office. He served as Minority Whip in the legislature from 2011 until his retirement.

References

External links
Pennsylvania House of Representatives – Mike Hanna (Democrat) – official PA House website
Pennsylvania House Democratic Caucus – Mike Hanna – official Party website

Living people
Democratic Party members of the Pennsylvania House of Representatives
1953 births
21st-century American politicians
People from Lock Haven, Pennsylvania